Chitra Bharti Kathamala was a popular Indian comic book publication during the early 1980s. It was the comic publication line of one of the India's biggest publishers of Engineering and technical books - S.Chand and Company Ltd, New Delhi. They finally ended publishing comics in the late 1980s.

Head Office
The head office of Chitra Bharti Kathamala was S.Chand and Company Ltd. Raamnagar, New Delhi, Pin 110055. The company still publishes educational books, and its head office remains the same. They, however, do not publish the comic series any more.

Frequency/ Language
The Chitra Bharti Kathamala enjoyed moderate success. The company used to publish one comic every fortnight making it a total of 24 issues in a year. The comics were published both in Hindi and English languages.

Characters and Themes
The following were the regular characters in the Chitra Bharti Kathamala Universe
 Secret Agent 005 - Junior James Bond
 Space Star (Captain Gaurav)
 Private Detective Kapil
 Chandru
 Manasputra
 Bhabhi Ji
 Chocolate (Collection)

Apart from these regular characters, themes ranged from fairy and knight tales, general, social andcomical stories to the biographies of historical personalities and details of historical monuments and events.

List of Chitra Bharti Kathamala

List of Chocolate Comics

Sangam Series (Reprint Collection)

Indian comics
Comic book publishing companies of India